Claire Heliot (9 February 1866, in Halle (Saale) – 9 June 1953, in Stuttgart) was a German lion tamer.

She was born Klara Haumann (Huth). Her father was a government postal official.

In April 1897, she caused a sensation when she first performed at a zoo in Leipzig. She toured extensively. Accompanied by ten lions, she performed at the London Hippodrome in 1901. In America, Heriot's act was part of A Yankee Circus on Mars, appearing at the New York Hippodrome for 20 weeks in 1905 and 1906 and in Chicago in 1906. The high point of her act was carrying her ten-year-old,  lion Sicchi on her back and shoulders. In 1907, a nervous Heliot was attacked by her lions and severely injured while performing at the Circus Orlando in Copenhagen; she was rescued by three attendants. After she retired, she was reported working as a hairdresser in 1930.

The Heliot restaurant at the Hippodrome Casino in London is named after her.

References

External links
 
 Image of "Claire Heliot with Lion"

1866 births
1953 deaths
German women
Lion tamers
People from Halle (Saale)